Donald Robert Hunstein (November 19, 1928 – March 18, 2017) was an American photographer.

Life 

He studied at Washington University in St. Louis, graduating in 1950. Later he served in the United States Air Force in England. He returned to the United States in 1954 and settled in New York City. In 1955, Hunstein started working for Columbia Records, photographing such artists as Duke Ellington, Billie Holiday, Tony Bennett, Barbra Streisand, Leonard Bernstein, Miles Davis, The Byrds, Aretha Franklin, and Janis Joplin. He remained there until 1986. Some of his photographs were published in 2013 book Keeping Time: The Photographs of Don Hunstein. One of his best-known images is of Bob Dylan walking with Suze Rotolo: it was used for the cover of Dylan's album The Freewheelin' Bob Dylan.

He died on 18 March 2017 at the age of 88, from Alzheimer's disease.

References

External links

Thorsten Overgaard Story Behind That Picture on Don Hunstein and his Freewheelin' cover for Bob Dylan

1928 births
2017 deaths
American photographers
Washington University in St. Louis alumni
Deaths from Alzheimer's disease
Deaths from dementia in New York (state)
Columbia Records